Kumbungu is a town in the Kumbungu District of the Northern Region of Ghana. Kumbungu is the capital of Kumbungu district. As of 2010, fertility rate in Kumbungu stood at 3.6 (above the national average of 3.5) and had a total population of 39,341 with an almost equal ratio of females to males. Kumbungu has a market center which comes off in every 6th day.

Economic activities 
Farming and petty trading make up a portion of the economic activities in the town.

See also
 Satani

References

Populated places in the Northern Region (Ghana)